Michael Karim Malarkey  (born 21 June 1983) is a British-American actor and musician. He is best known for playing the role of Enzo in the series The Vampire Diaries.

Early life
Malarkey was born in Beirut, Lebanon, to an Irish American father and a British mother of Palestinian and Italian origins. He is the oldest of three brothers and was raised in Yellow Springs, Ohio. In 2006, Malarkey travelled to England to study at the London Academy of Music and Dramatic Art.

Personal life
Malarkey is married to Nadine Lewington since 2009, an English actress, with whom he has two sons, Marlon (2014) and Hugo (2019). They played together in one episode of Project Blue Book.

Career
Malarkey had his beginnings on the London stage appearing in various theatre productions including lead roles in Spring Storm by Tennessee Williams and Beyond the Horizon by Eugene O'Neill at Royal National Theatre, an adaptation of The Great Gatsby in the role of Jay Gatsby and in the Original London Company of Million Dollar Quartet in the role of singer Elvis Presley. 
 
Malarkey also appeared in several film and television projects including recurring roles in series'  Raw for Rte and Mr. Sloane with Nick Frost before landing the role of Lorenzo "Enzo" St. John in season 5 of the television series The Vampire Diaries as a recurring character. After gaining popularity with the viewing public, Malarkey's role was upgraded to a series regular starting in Season 6 and through the end of Season 8.

In 2017 he appeared as "Dizel" in Jean-Claude Van Johnson for Amazon Video, as "Sam Foster" in The Oath for Crackle and as "Cinch Barton" in film A Violent Separation. 

Malarkey played the role of Captain Michael Quinn in Project Blue Book for The History Channel.

As a musician, after two EPs in 2014 and 2015, he released his debut full-length record, Mongrels on 8 September 2017 accompanied by music videos for singles Uncomfortably Numb and Mongrels. In January 2020, Malarkey released his second album, Graveracer.

Filmography

Video games

Theatre
2009: Inches Apart as Lee (Theatre 503, London – Winner of Theatre 503/Old Vic New Voices Award)
2010: Spring Storm as Arthur (The National Theatre, London)
2010: Beyond the Horizon as Robert (The National Theatre, London)
2011: Million Dollar Quartet (musical) as Elvis Presley (Original London Company – Noël Coward Theatre, West End)
2012: The Intervention as Jed (Assembly Rooms, Edinburgh)
2012: The Great Gatsby as Jay Gatsby (Wilton's Music Hall, London)

Discography
EP’s
Feed the Flames (2014)
Knots (2015)
 Captain Solitaire (2018)
 Strays (2022)
Singles
 Feed the Flames (2014)
 Dancing in the Grey (2015)
 Scars (2017)
 Mongrels (2017)
 Dog Dream (2017)
 I Just Want You (2017)
 Captain Solitaire (2018)
 To Be a Man (Mahogany Sessions) (2018)
 Graveracer (2019)
Studio albums

 Mongrels (2017)
 Graveracer (2020)

References

External links

Michael Malarkey Fansite
Michael Malarkey on Instagram

American male television actors
1983 births
Living people
British people of Arab descent
British people of Lebanese descent
British people of Italian descent
American male stage actors
American people of Arab descent
American people of British descent
American people of Irish descent
American people of Italian descent
Lebanese emigrants to the United States
American male film actors
American male video game actors
British male television actors
British male film actors
British male video game actors